Pterogeniidae is a family of beetles belonging to the supefamily Tenebrionoidea. They are found in South Asia, Southeast Asia, China, New Guinea and the Solomon Islands. Adults and larvae have been found associated with the fruiting bodies of polypore fungi, although adults can also be found in litter and debris.

Taxonomy 
Genera in the family include: 

 Histanocerus Southeast Asia, New Guinea, Solomon Islands
 Pterogenius Sri Lanka.
 Kryptogenius India and Southeast Asia
 Tychogenius Borneo
 Katagenius (from southern India)
 Laenagenius China
 Anogenius Malay Peninsula

References

External links 
http://nomen.at/Tenebrionoidea

Tenebrionoidea
Beetle families